Joe Chapman (August 4, 1938 – December 11, 2016) was an American politician. He served as a Democratic member for the 9th district of the Florida House of Representatives.

Life and career 
Chapman attended the University of Florida and the University of Florida College of Law.

In 1968, Chapman was elected to represent the 9th district of the Florida House of Representatives, succeeding Ben Clarence Williams. He served until 1972, when he was succeeded by Billy Joe Rish.

Chapman died in December 2016, at the age of 78.

References 

1938 births
2016 deaths
Democratic Party members of the Florida House of Representatives
20th-century American politicians
University of Florida alumni
Fredric G. Levin College of Law alumni